z. b. V. (also z.b.V., ZBV, ZbV, and zbV) is an abbreviation for the German phrase zur besonderen Verwendung, or alternatively the synonymous phrase zur besonderen Verfügung.

Translation 
Translations for the phrases zur besonderen Verwendung and zur besonderen Verfügung include: 

 'for special deployment'.
 'for special duties'.

Uses

Economy 
During World War II, some German state-controlled businesses in the civilian and military economy received the z. b. V. designation.

German Wehrmacht 
In the Wehrmacht, the German armed forces during World War II, officer staffs designated z. b. V. were staffs without subordinate combat troops. These staffs stood by either in general reserves or in the reserves of particular armies or army groups, waiting to be activated as the staffs of new combat units. The German air force had similar z. b. V. staffs for regional air defense purposes, the Luftgaustäbe.

Next to officer staffs, singular officers could also be designated z. b. V., for example as Gen. z.b.V.b. ObdH, General zur besonderen Verfügung beim Oberbefehlshaber des Heeres, 'general attached to the commander-in-chief of the army'.

Starting in 1941, Wehrmacht probationary- and punishment units would also receive the z.b.V. designation. These units were made up of men that were convicted of minor and disciplinary offenses and had a specific criteria for joining. However as the war progressed, the criteria would soon be limited only to fitness for combat and mental health. By the war's end, almost all of the requirements were dropped and these units were filled with men completely unfit for combat, thus losing any effectiveness.

References

See also
 GmbH

German words and phrases
Business in Germany